Luis Patiño (born 6 October 1993) is a Mexican tennis player.

Patiño has a career high ATP singles ranking of 567, achieved on 18 March 2019. He also has a career high ATP doubles ranking of 239, achieved on 14 September 2015. Patiño has won 7 ITF doubles titles.

Patiño made his ATP main draw debut at the 2016 Abierto Mexicano Telcel, where he received a wildcard into the singles draw.

Challenger and Futures/World Tennis Tour Finals

Singles: 3 (0–3)

Doubles 11 (3–8)

External links

1993 births
Living people
Mexican male tennis players
Sportspeople from Guadalajara, Jalisco
Sportspeople from Mazatlán
Tennis players at the 2015 Pan American Games
Pan American Games competitors for Mexico
20th-century Mexican people
21st-century Mexican people